Francisco 'Fran' Alejandro Pineda Macías (born 23 March 1988) is a Spanish retired footballer who played as a forward.

Club career
Born in Málaga, Andalusia, Pineda made his senior debuts for local Alhaurín de la Torre CF in the 2008–09 campaign, in the regional leagues. In January 2009 he moved to fellow league team Alcobendas CF, and continued to appear in the lower leagues in the following years, representing Atlético Benamiel CF, CD Rincón and UD Altea.

On  March 1, 2012 Pineda moved abroad for the first time in his career, joining Moldovan National Division side FC Milsami Orhei. He made his debut as a professional two days later, starting in a 1–0 away win against FC Iskra-Stal.

In the 2012 summer Pineda returned to his former club Alhaurín de la Torre in Tercera División, but moved to fellow league team CA Ceuta in November. On  January 31, he signed for Segunda División B side UCAM Murcia CF, and scored five goals during the season, which ended in relegation.

On August 21, 2013 Pineda joined Xerez CD, freshly relegated to the fourth level. He rescinded with the club in October, and signed a three-and-a-half year deal with Moghreb Tétouan on  January 13, 2014.

On July 15,  2014 Pineda was released by Moghreb, and moved to CF Badalona on  August 28. After featuring rarely he rescinded his link and joined fourth-tier SD Formentera on  January 16 of the following year.

References

External links
 
 

1988 births
Living people
Footballers from Málaga
Spanish footballers
Footballers from Andalusia
Association football forwards
Segunda División B players
Tercera División players
Divisiones Regionales de Fútbol players
UCAM Murcia CF players
Xerez CD footballers
CF Badalona players
SD Formentera players
Antequera CF footballers
Moghreb Tétouan players
Spanish expatriate footballers
Spanish expatriate sportspeople in Moldova
Spanish expatriate sportspeople in Morocco
Expatriate footballers in Moldova
Expatriate footballers in Morocco
AD Ceuta FC players